United Nations Security Council resolution 721, adopted unanimously on 27 November 1991, after reaffirming Resolution 713 (1991) on the situation in the SFR Yugoslavia, the council strongly supported the efforts of the Secretary-General Javier Pérez de Cuéllar and his Personal Envoy to help end the outbreak of fighting in parts of the country, in the hope of establishing a peacekeeping mission.

The Council noted however, that the deployment of a peacekeeping mission cannot take place without the parties involved fully observing the ceasefire agreements signed. The resolution also noted that the council will examine recommendations of the Secretary-General including the recommendation of establishing a possible peacekeeping mission in the country.

See also
 Croatian War of Independence
 List of United Nations Security Council Resolutions 701 to 800 (1991–1993)
 Slovenian Independence War
 United Nations Protection Force
 Yugoslav Wars

References

External links
 
Text of the Resolution at undocs.org

 0721
 0721
1991 in Yugoslavia
 0721
November 1991 events